Dendragama australis is a species of lizard in the family Agamidae. It is endemic to Sumatra.

References

Dendragama
Reptiles of Indonesia
Endemic fauna of Sumatra
Reptiles described in 2017
Taxa named by Michael B. Harvey